Habberley is a small village in the English county of Shropshire.

Habberley lies near the Stiperstones southwest of the town of Shrewsbury.

Formerly a small civil parish in its own right Habberley was merged in to the Pontesbury civil parish in 1967. Its main amenities are a small Anglican church (St Mary's), a public house (The Mytton Arms), and village hall.

In 1824 its population was recorded as 151 - by 1961 this had declined to 66 but residential development such as the conversion of redundant farm buildings has seen it rise again to about 100 residents in 2012. Mary Webb, the romantic novelist, called the place and surrounding district 'Bitterley' in her 1916 novel The Golden Arrow.

See also
Listed buildings in Pontesbury

References

External links

Villages in Shropshire